This is a list of Anglicans, notable persons who were members of the church in communion with the Archbishop of Canterbury, known as an Anglican Communion church. Members of schismatic churches may also be included. Only former Anglicans who left the church in adulthood may be included, with accompanying notice.

A to E
Joseph Abbott (clergyman)
Dean Acheson, American statesman
Daniel Dulany Addison 
Robert Addison
Spiro Agnew, American statesman 
Howard Ahmanson Jr. 
Madeleine Albright, American stateswoman
John Allin
Charles P. Anderson
Prince Andrew, Duke of York
Lancelot Andrewes (1555–1626), saintly English bishop and scholar, who oversaw the translation of the Authorized Version (or King James Version) of the Bible.
Anne, Princess Royal
Thomas Arnold, schoolmaster
Chester Arthur (1829–1886), 21st President of the United States (1881–85)
Fred Astaire, great American dancer
Jane Austen
W. V. Awdry, clergyman and writer of the Railway Series" books.
Anne Ayres 
Charles Babbage, mathematician
Ed Bacon, priest of the Episcopal Church
Francis Bacon, lawyer and philosopher
Jacob Bailey, Congregational church preacher who converted
Douglas M. Baker Jr. 
Fred Barnes
Isaac Barrow
Diana Butler Bass, author, independent scholar, and church historian
Evan Bayh
Princess Beatrice of York
Canon Gareth Bennett (1929–1987), Anglican priest and academic and critic of the Church of England
Richard Meux Benson
R. J. Berry
John Betjeman (1906–1984)
James Blair (Virginia)
James Blish, (atheist as an adult, then rejoined the church)
Robert Boyle, natural philosopher
Marion Zimmer Bradley
Thomas Browne (1605–1682), English polymath
Thomas Church Brownell
Edmond Browning
Anne Brontë
Charlotte Brontë
Emily Brontë
Charles Sumner Burch
Gilbert Burnet 
George H. W. Bush, American statesman
Prescott Bush
Joseph Butler
Samuel Butler (1613–1680), author of the religious and political satire Hudibras
Harry F. Byrd
James F. Byrnes (1882–1972), South Carolina politician and U. S. Supreme Court Justice (convert from the Roman Catholic Church)
Cab Calloway, American musician
David Cameron, British politician
Camilla, Duchess of Cornwall
Justin R. Cannon, American clergyman
Robert Farrar Capon
George Carey, former Archbishop of Canterbury
Robert Carliell, didactic poet
Lewis Carroll (1832–1898)
William Cassels (1858–1925), one of the Cambridge Seven
Catherine, Duchess of Cambridge
Owen Chadwick (b. 1916), British academic and historian of Christianity
Saxby Chambliss
Charles III (b. 1948), King of the United Kingdom and the other Commonwealth realms since 2022
Philander Chase
Salmon P. Chase
Don Cherry, hockey player
Christy Clark, Premier Of British Columbia
Thomas M. Clark
Eleanor Clitheroe-Bell
Henry John Cody
Richard Coles, vicar and former member of pop band The Communards
Samuel Taylor Coleridge 
Judy Collins, singer, songwriter
Wallace E. Conkling
James Cook
Walter William Covey-Crump (1865–1949) English clergyman
Thomas Cranmer (1489–1556), Archbishop of Canterbury, leader of the English Reformation, and martyr
Ander Crenshaw 
Alexander Cruden
T. Pelham Dale
George Dallas
Jonathan Myrick Daniels, 
Charles Darwin, scientist (later agnostic)
Ann B. Davis
Jefferson Davis (1808–1889), President of the Confederate States of America
Cecil B. DeMille, film director
Philip Dick
Benjamin Disraeli (born into a Jewish family, baptized as Anglican at age 12)
Gregory Dix 	
John Donne (1572–1631), (convert from Catholicism, was ordained as an Anglican; Dean of St Paul's & metaphysical poet)
Vyvyan Donnithorne (1886–1968), English missionary in Sichuan
Marie Dressler, actress
Prince Edward, Earl of Wessex
T. S. Eliot (1885–1965), poet
Elizabeth I of England, Queen of England and Wales
Elizabeth II (1926–2022), Queen of the United Kingdom and the other Commonwealth realms from 1952 to 2022
Duke Ellington, American musician
Madeleine L'Engle 	
Werner Erhard
Princess Eugenie of York
George Every
Jim Exon

F to J
Nigel Farage
Austin Farrer (1904–1968), English theologian, philosopher, and friend of C. S. Lewis
Mary Ferrar (1551–1634), founder of the Little Gidding community 
Nicholas Ferrar (1592–1637), deacon and leader of the Little Gidding community, publisher of the poetry of George Herbert 
John Neville Figgis 	
Geoffrey Fisher, Archbishop
Robert Fludd (1574–1637), English physician, astrologer, mathematician, cosmologist, Qabalist and Rosicrucian
Betty Ford
Gerald Ford, American politician
Dave Freudenthal
Accepted Frewen
Alexander Frey
Thomas Gage (clergyman)
Judy Garland (1922–1969), American actress
Alexander Charles Garrett
David Garrick, actor
Lillian Gish
William Gladstone
Barry Goldwater
Hannibal Goodwin
Charles Gore
Elizabeth Goudge (1900–1984), English novelist
James Grahame 
John Galbraith Graham
Alexander Viets Griswold
Frank Griswold
Chuck Hagel
Stephen Hales
Edmond Halley
Diana Reader Harris
William Henry Harrison
Prince Harry, Duke of Sussex
William Dodd Hathaway
Olivia de Havilland
Thomas A. Hendricks
George Herbert (1593–1633), Welsh-born English poet, orator and Anglican priest
Paul Hewson
Peter Heylin or Heylyn (1599–1662), English clergyman and author of many polemical, historical, political and theological tracts
John Hines
Ian Hislop
Peter Hitchens
John Henry Hobart
Thomas Hobbes
Canon Percy Holbrook
Robert Hooke
Richard Hooker (1554–1600), Anglican priest and theologian of major importance
Dave Hope (Anglican Mission in America)
John Henry Hopkins
Reverend Robert Alfred Humble
James Otis Sargent Huntington
Carolyn Tanner Irish
Simon Islip
Molly Ivins
Andrea Jaeger 
Alphonso Jackson
Katharine Jefferts Schori
Ben Jonson
Charles Edward Jenkins III
Edward Jenner
Jeffrey John
Boris Johnson, convert from Catholicism
Lady Bird Johnson
Samuel Johnson
Absalom Jones
Trevor Jones (priest)
Benjamin Jowett
Bernard Judd

K to O
Jan Karon
John Keble (1792–1866), poet and churchman
Garrison Keillor
Jackson Kemper
Harriette A. Keyser
Charles Kingsley (1819–1875)
Jack Kingston
Dave Kopay
Ini Kopuria
Fiorello La Guardia (1882–1947)
Arthur Lake
William Laud (1573–1645), Archbishop of Canterbury executed during the English Civil War
Timothy Laurence
Alfred Lee
Henry "Light Horse Harry" Lee III (1756–1818), Revolutionary War officer, Governor of Virginia, eulogist of George Washington, and father of Robert E. Lee
Robert E. Lee (1807–1870), Confederate general
C. S. Lewis (1898–1963), atheist as an adult, then rejoined the church
Arthur Lichtenberger
Rod Liddle
Henry Parry Liddon
Blanche Lincoln
Bob Livingston
John Locke (1632–1704)
Adam Loftus
Charles Fuge Lowder
George Lukins
Henry Francis Lyte
John A. Macdonald, convert from Presbyterianism
John Macquarrie
James Madison (1751–1836), fourth President of the United States (1809–1817), the “Father of the Constitution” and the key champion and author of the United States Bill of Rights
Guglielmo Marconi
Charles Mathias
John Mbiti
John McCain (former, then  became a practicing Baptist)
Alister McGrath (b. 1953), Northern Irish native theologian, priest, intellectual historian and Christian apologist
Victor McLaglen
John Milbank
Reverend Joseph Miller Congregational Minister who became an Anglican priest
Bernard Mizeki
James Monroe (1758–1831), fifth President of the United States (1817–1825)
Elizabeth Moon
Benjamin Moore (1748–1816)
Edward Morrow
Francis Joseph Mullin, seventh president of Shimer College 
John Gardner Murray
John Mason Neale (1818–1866)
Ursula Niebuhr
Florence Nightingale (1820–1910)
Albert Jay Nock
Eleanor Holmes Norton
Sabelo Stanley Ntwasa 
Henry Oldenburg
Ashley Olsen
Benjamin Treadwell Onderdonk
John Michael "Ozzy" Osbourne
Harry Oppenheimer, convert from Judaism
George Orwell (1903–1950)
John Ostrander
George Owen

P to T
Horatio Parker 
Charles William Pearson
Percy Pennybacker 
James De Wolf Perry
Prince Philip, Duke of Edinburgh (1921–2021), husband of Elizabeth II (convert from Greek Orthodox)
Autumn Phillips
Mark Phillips
Peter Phillips
Zara Phillips
Franklin Pierce (1804–1869), 14th President of the United States of America
Reverend Jonas Pilling
Charles Cotesworth Pinckney (1746–1825), South Carolina Revolutionary War veteran, delegate to the Constitutional Convention, and Federalist Party presidential candidate
Arthur T. Polhill-Turner (1862–1935), one of the Cambridge Seven
Cecil H. Polhill-Turner (1860–1938), one of the Cambridge Seven
Montagu Proctor-Beauchamp (1860–1939), one of the Cambridge Seven
Samuel Provoost (1742–1815), third Presiding Bishop of the Episcopal Church, USA
Edward Bouverie Pusey (1800–1882), one of the leaders of the Oxford Movement
James Ramsay, abolitionist
Michael Ramsey (1904–1988), 100th Archbishop of Canterbury
John Randolph of Roanoke (1773–1833), Virginian Congressman and U. S. Minister to Russia
George Read (1733–1788), signer of the Declaration of Independence from Delaware and a delegate to the U.S. Constitutional Convention of 1787
Tatum Reed
Martin Rees
George F. Regas
Gene Robinson
Eleanor Roosevelt (1884–1962), wife of Franklin Roosevelt and "First Lady of the World" 
Franklin Delano Roosevelt (1882–1945), 32nd President of the United States (1933–1945)
Dante Gabriel Rossetti, artist
Christina Rossetti, poet
Maria Francesca Rossetti 
J. K. Rowling
Sarah, Duchess of York
Dorothy L. Sayers (1893–1957), English crime writer, poet, playwright, essayist, translator and Christian humanist
Samuel Seabury
William Shakespeare
Henry Sherrill
Charles Simeon, leading evangelical
C. H. Sisson (1914–2003), poet and critic of the Church of England
Christopher Smart 
Benjamin B. Smith
Cordwainer Smith
Chʽeng-Tsi Song (1892–1955), Bishop of West Szechwan
Sophie, Countess of Wessex
David Souter
Diana, Princess of Wales, royal princess
William Archibald Spooner, Oxford academic
Russell Stannard
John Steinbeck (1902–1968), American novelist
Laurence Sterne (1713–1768), Anglican clergyman and Anglo-Irish novelist whose best remembered novel is The Life and Opinions of Tristram Shandy, GentlemanSufjan Stevens, American singer
Ted Stevens
Charles Studd (1860–1931), one of the Cambridge Seven
Frederick Reginald Pinfold Sumner, deacon and photographer
E. W. Swanton, journalist and cricket commentator
Jonathan Swift (1667–1745), Anglo-Irish clergyman, satirist, essayist, political pamphleteer known for works such as Gulliver's Travels, A Modest Proposal, A Journal to Stella, Drapier's Letters, The Battle of the Books, An Argument Against Abolishing Christianity, and A Tale of a TubStuart Symington
Robert A. Taft
Ethelbert Talbot
Oliver Tambo (1917–1993), South African anti-apartheid politician and revolutionary who served as President of the African National Congress (ANC) from 1967 to 1991.
Jeremy Taylor (1613–1667), Anglican bishop in Ireland and devotional writer 
Michael Taylor, of Ossett
Zachary Taylor
Alfred Lord Tennyson, poet
R. S. Thomas, Welsh clergyman and poet
Martin Thornton (1915–1986), British priest and spiritual director known for his writings on ascetical theology
Arthur Tooth, Anglican priest noted for Ritualism
Richard Chenevix Trench 
Henry St. George Tucker
Daniel S. Tuttle
Desmond Tutu, South African bishop; Archbishop of Cape Town 
Millard E. Tydings
John Tyler

U to Z
Evelyn Underhill (1875–1941)
Peter van Inwagen
Henry Vaughan (1621−1695), Welsh poet
Thomas Vaughan (1621−1666), Welsh clergyman, philosopher and alchemist
Henry A. Wallace
Keith Ward
George Washington
Sam Waterston
Francis Wharton
Alfred Wheeler, Australian composer
William White
George Whitefield
Oscar Wilde (1854–1900), Irish dramatist and poet (converted on his deathbed to Roman Catholicism)
William, Prince of Wales (b. 1982)
John Williams
Robin Williams
Rowan Williams, former Archbishop of Canterbury
John Wilmot, 2nd Earl of Rochester, deathbed convert
Selina Win Pe
Colin Winter 
Rev. Charles Woodmason (c''. 1720–1789), diarist and missionary to colonial South Carolina
William Wordsworth
William Butler Yeats

See also
List of Anglican church composers - includes some non-Anglicans who wrote Anglican church music.
List of people who have converted to Anglicanism
:Category:Anglican writers

References

External links

Adherents.com
Political Graveyard: Episcopalian and Anglican section